Two ships of the Royal Navy have borne the name HMS Portia. Another was renamed before being launched, while yet another was never completed:

  was a 14-gun brig-sloop launched in 1810 and sold in 1817.
 HMS Portia was to have been a  gunvessel. She was laid down in 1861, but cancelled in 1863.
  was a fleet messenger sunk in 1915 by SM U-28
She was renamed  in 1913, and launched in 1914.
  was an  launched in 1916. She was sold in 1921 and scrapped in 1922.

Royal Navy ship names